Tiger was Jerry Garcia's main guitar from 1979 to 1989. It was designed and built by Sonoma County luthier Doug Irwin. The instrument was commissioned by Garcia in 1973 following delivery of Wolf, his first major Irwin-built guitar. Upon commissioning the instrument, Garcia enjoined Irwin to "make it the way he thought was best, and don't hold back."

Throughout the design and construction process, it was provisionally designated "the Garcia". The final name came from the tiger inlaid on the preamp cover located on the guitar's top, just behind the tailpiece. The body features several layers of wood laminated together face-to-face in a configuration referred to as a "hippie sandwich" by employees of Alembic Inc., where Irwin worked for a brief period in the early 1970s. The combination of several heavy varieties of wood, plus solid brass binding and hardware resulted in an unusually heavy instrument, weighing . After Garcia began using a new Irwin guitar (known as Rosebud) in December 1989, Tiger became his backup guitar.

During the Grateful Dead's final concert on July 9, 1995, a mechanical problem arose with Rosebud. Tiger was brought out and thus became the last guitar Garcia played in public.

Electronics
The electronics of Garcia's Irwin guitars are unique, and feature an onboard preamp and effects loop. Much like a Stratocaster, the three pickups are selected with a five-way switch.  Signal from the pickups passes through the tone controls, followed by an op-amp based buffer preamp, or unity gain buffer, which is designed to prevent signal loss due to capacitance when long cables are used. From the preamp, the signal could be routed via a mini-toggle on the guitar's face to pass through a Y-cable to Garcia's effects rack, and then back into the guitar.  This onboard effects loop serves to send the full output of Tiger's pickups to the effects while allowing the guitar's volume control to vary the final output.

The effects loop could be bypassed by the aforementioned switch, sending the guitar's signal from the preamp to the volume control, and then out to Garcia's preamped (and heavily modified) Fender Twin Reverb into a McIntosh MC2300 solid state power amplifier. Tiger started with DiMarzio Dual Sound humbuckers in the middle and bridge positions with a DiMarzio SDS-1 single coil at the neck. The humbuckers were switched to Dimarzio Super II's in 1982. Each of the humbuckers is equipped with a coil cut switch.

In summation, there is one 5 way pickup selector, one master volume control, one tone control which affects the neck and bridge pickups, and one which affects the middle pickup as well as three mini toggles, two for the coil-cut of the bridge and middle pickups respectively and one for the on-board effects loop on/off.

Disposition
After Garcia's death, a dispute arose between Irwin and the Grateful Dead regarding ownership of Garcia's four Doug Irwin guitars. In his will, Garcia gave possession of these instruments to Irwin.  The Grateful Dead challenged whether Garcia had the right to convey title and insisted that the band owned the instruments. The parties reached a settlement in 2001 where Irwin was awarded two of the guitars, Tiger and Wolf, and the Grateful Dead took possession of the other two, Rosebud and Headless (the latter of which Garcia had never played onstage).

Irwin sold Tiger and Wolf at auction on May 8, 2002. Tiger was purchased by Jim Irsay for $957,500, including commission. Wolf was purchased by Daniel Pritzker for $789,500.

In 2017, Pritzker sold Wolf for $1.9 million at an auction to benefit the Southern Poverty Law Center. The buyer was  Brian Halligan.

See also
Doug Irwin
Alembic Inc
Jerry Garcia
Grateful Dead
List of guitars

References

Further reading
Jackson, Blair (2006). Grateful Dead Gear, Backbeat Books.

External links
Tiger on Dozin.com
Tiger at Garcia Guitars and Gear Directory

Electric guitars
Individual guitars
Instruments of musicians
Jerry Garcia